Velemín is a municipality and village in Litoměřice District in the Ústí nad Labem Region of the Czech Republic. It has about 1,600 inhabitants.

Administrative parts
Villages of Bílinka, Bílý Újezd, Boreč, Březno, Dobkovičky, Hrušovka, Kletečná, Milešov, Oparno and Režný Újezd are administrative parts of Velemín.

Notable people
Josef Anders (1863–1936), botanist and lichenologist

References

Villages in Litoměřice District